L. Catherine Brinson is an American materials scientist who is the Sharon C. and Harold L. Yoh, III Distinguished Professor at Duke University. Her research considers nanostructured polymers and shape-memory alloys. She was elected a Fellow of the American Association for the Advancement of Science in 2020.

Early life and education 
Brinson studied engineering and materials science at Virginia Tech. She spent her summer holidays working at the United States Naval Research Laboratory and Hercules Aerospace. She moved to the California Institute of Technology for her graduate studies, where she worked alongside Wolfgang Gustav Knauss on the time-temperature response of multi-phase viscoelastic solids. She completed her doctoral research in 1990, after which she visited Germany to work at the German Aerospace Center.

Research and career 
Brinson studies novel materials and the development of state-of-the-art characterisation techniques to better understand material behaviour. In 1992 she started her independent scientific career at Northwestern University. Here she focussed on the hierarchical structural properties of novel material systems, alongside serving as Associate Dean for Academic Initiatives and Chair of the Department of Mechanical Engineering. She combined computational models, data science and experimental research to further the development of new materials.

Brinson joined Duke University in 2017 as the Sharon C. and Harold L. Yoh, III Professor. Upon arriving at Duke, Brinson was awarded $5 million from the National Science Foundation to create an organized, searchable data repository on next-generation materials. She is developing the databases in collaboration with Cynthia Rudin, Deborah McGuinness and Chiara Daraio. The database includes materials such as polymer nanocomposities and structural metamaterials, along with analytical and predictive software to help accelerate the design and discovery of new materials. The nanocomposites developed by Brinson incorporate nanoparticles and nanotubes, and find application in several industries, from cars to advanced sporting equipment. The two frameworks designed by Brinson include NanoMine and MetaMine, which extract data from scientific papers, visualise and compare data, They make use of machine learning to understand the fundamental properties of materials. 

In 2019, Brinson was named Chair of Mechanical Engineering & Materials Science at Duke University.

Awards and honours 

 2006 Alexander von Humboldt Foundation Friedrich Wilhelm Bessel Prize
 2007 Elected Fellow of the Society for Engineering Science
 2013 Elected Fellow of the American Academy of Mechanics
 2014 American Society of Mechanical Engineers Nadai Medal
 2020 Elected Fellow of the American Association for the Advancement of Science

Selected publications

Books

References 

Living people
Year of birth missing (living people)
California Institute of Technology alumni
Duke University faculty
American materials scientists